This is a list of modern Greek military bases in Greece that are operated by the Military of Greece:

Army bases

 Larissa 
 Kozani 
 Koufovouno 
 Alexandroupoli 
 Megalo Pefko 
 Pachi

Naval bases
 Corfu
 Myrina 
 Samothrace
 Salamis Naval Base 
Souda Bay (Crete Naval Base) 
 SDAM (ex-NATO COMEDEAST) Agia Paraskevi  
 Navy radio station  
 Agia Marina 
 Troulos Aeginas  
 Kiriamadi

Air bases
Andravida military airport
Araxos military airport – GPA, Greece, Patras
Eleusis military base 
Tanagra military airport 
Tatoi Air Base
Larissa Air Base
Souda Air Base
Sedes Air Base (Mikra)
Tripoli Air Base
Lemnos Air Base
Skyros Air Base 
Kasteli Air Base
Agrinio Air Base
Aktion Air Base
Rhodes Maritsa Airport

See also
List of military bases